Goniurellia spinifera is a species of tephritid or fruit flies in the genus Goniurellia of the family Tephritidae.

Distribution
Israel, Saudi Arabia, Yemen, Egypt, Sudan, Eritrea, Ethiopia.

References

Tephritinae
Insects described in 1980
Diptera of Asia
Diptera of Africa